The Carrick River is a river of Fiordland, close to the southwesternmost point of New Zealand's South Island. Its course is predominantly southward, and passes through numerous small lakes, most notably Lake Victor, before reaching the sea at the Islet Cove of Te Korowhakaunu / Kanáris Sound.

See also
List of rivers of New Zealand

References

Rivers of Fiordland